Alla Dmitriyevna Larionova (19 February 1931, in Moscow, USSR – 25 April 2000, in Moscow, Russia) was a Soviet and Russian theater and film actress. People's Artist of the RSFSR (1990). Wife of the People's Artist of the RSFSR Nikolai Rybnikov. They raised two daughters — Alyona from Larionova's previous relationship with Ivan Pereverzev, and their biological child Arina.

She was buried at the Troyekurovskoye Cemetery.

Selected filmography
 Michurin (1948) (uncredited)
 Sadko (1953)
 Hostile Whirlwinds (1953)
 The Anna Cross (1954)
 Twelfth Night (1955)
 The Drummer's Fate (1955)
 Fathers and Sons (1958)
 Thrice Resurrected (1960)
 Come Here, Mukhtar! (1965)
 Nights of Farewell (1965)
 Magician (1967)

References

External links

1931 births
2000 deaths
Russian film actresses
Soviet film actresses
People's Artists of the RSFSR
Honored Artists of the RSFSR
Burials in Troyekurovskoye Cemetery
Russian Academy of Theatre Arts alumni
20th-century Russian women
Actresses from Moscow